"Don't Go Away" is a Eurodance song by German band Fun Factory, released as the fourth single from their second album, Fun-Tastic (1995). It was a success in Spain, peaking at number six. Additionally, it peaked at number 31 in Austria and number 37 in Germany. Outside Europe, it reached number 93 on the Billboard Hot 100 chart in the US.

Critical reception
Larry Flick from Billboard described the song as "a reggae-splashed ditty", comparing it to Ace of Base's 1992 hit "All That She Wants". He added that the key difference is "the use of throaty male rapping, as well as a slew of versions that tip-toe through jeep-funk and house grooves". A reviewer from British magazine Music Week rated it three out of five, writing, "Jolly reggae'n rap from the band who sell in huge quantities on the Continent, but have yet to make an impact here."

Music video
A music video was produced to promote the single, directed by V. Hannwacker & M. Rosenmüller. It features the band performing at a party on the beach. The video was later published on Fun Factory's official YouTube channel in August 2015. It has amassed more than 1 million views as of September 2021.

Track listing
 12" single, France (1996)
"Don't Go Away" (Real House Walk) – 4:41
"Don't Go Away" (Funky Dub Walk) – 4:55
"Don't Go Away" (Extended Walk) – 4:55
"Fun Factory's Break" – 4:31

 CD single, US (1996)
"Don't Go Away"
"Do Wah Diddy Diddy"

 CD maxi, Germany (1996)
"Don't Go Away" (Radio Walk) – 3:28
"Don't Go Away" (Extended Walk) – 4:55
"Don't Go Away" (Funky Dub Walk) – 4:55
"Don't Go Away" (Real House Walk) – 4:41
"Fun Factory's Break" – 4:31

Charts

References

 

1996 singles
1996 songs
Fun Factory (band) songs
English-language German songs
Songs written by Toni Cottura
Songs written by Bülent Aris